James McConnell  was a soldier in the United States Army and a Medal of Honor recipient for his actions in the Philippine–American War.

Almost 2 decades later, McConnell, by then a First Lieutenant, was also awarded the Distinguished Service Cross for actions in France during World War I. He was mortally wounded, and died the same day.

Medal of Honor citation
Rank and organization: Private, Company B, 33d Infantry, U.S. Volunteers. Place and date: At Vigan, Luzon, Philippine Islands, December 4, 1899. Entered service at: Detroit, Mich. Birth: Syracuse, N.Y. Date of issue: October 1, 1902.

Citation:

Fought for hours Iying between 2 dead comrades, notwithstanding his hat was pierced, his clothing plowed through by bullets, and his face cut and bruised by flying gravel.

See also

List of Medal of Honor recipients
List of Philippine–American War Medal of Honor recipients

References

External links

1878 births
1918 deaths
United States Army Medal of Honor recipients
United States Army officers
Military personnel from Syracuse, New York
American military personnel of the Philippine–American War
Philippine–American War recipients of the Medal of Honor
United States Army personnel of World War I
American military personnel killed in World War I